Pierre-Antoine Lemoine (1605–19 August 1665) was a French painter known for still lifes. He died in Paris. His Still Life with Bunches of Grapes, Figs, and Pomegranates shows Italian influence, and may have been exhibited for the Academy in 1654.

References

17th-century French painters
French male painters
1605 births
1665 deaths